The Wright Axcess-Floline was a low floor single-deck bus body built on the Scania L94UB chassis by Wrightbus between 1998 and 2001.

It was the successor to the Axcess-Ultralow on the Scania L113CRL chassis, and was visually almost identical to this model, but had slightly different side window spacing. It was also very similar to the Liberator and Renown bodies on Volvo chassis.

Of the 276 Axcess-Flolines produced, FirstGroup purchased 242.

Following the introduction of Wright's new-style Millennium range in 2000, the Axcess-Floline was superseded by the Solar on the same chassis.

References

External links

Low-floor buses
Vehicles introduced in 1998
Axcess-Floline